SLEP may refer to:

 Sleeper Either Class with Pantry, British Rail sleeping carriages with 24-beds
 Secondary Level English Proficiency test
 Shelf Life Extension Program of the Food and Drug Administration and U.S. Department of Defense
 Service Life Extension Program describes an extension or upgrade of an asset of the government, usually the U.S. military